Vazhapadi is a state assembly constituency in Salem district, Tamil Nadu, India. It exists from 1952 to 1962.

Madras state

Election results

1962

1952

References

External links
 

Salem district
Former assembly constituencies of Tamil Nadu